The common seasnail (Liparis liparis) is a small marine fish of the seasnail family (Liparidae) in the order Scorpaeniformes, the scorpionfishes and flatheads. It is found in the northeastern Atlantic Ocean where it lives on the seabed.

Description
The common seasnail is an unusual-looking fish with a large head and front part of the body and a laterally compressed posterior part of the body and large fringing fins. The bony head has two pairs of nostrils on the snout. The pectoral fins are very large and unite beneath the body. The pelvic fins take the form of a large sucking disc located between the pectorals. The dorsal fin has 27 to 36 soft rays and both it and the anal fins overlap the caudal fin. The skin is slimy and lacks scales.

Distribution
The common seasnail is native to the northeastern Atlantic Ocean as far east as the Barents Sea, Novaya Zemlya, Spitsbergen and Bear Island and as far south as the British Isles. It is also present in the Baltic Sea and North Sea, the waters around Iceland and Greenland and as far west as the Gulf of Maine.

Biology
The common seasnail feeds on small crustaceans, such as shrimps, crabs and amphipods, and also polychaete worms and fish. It breeds in the winter in the southern part of its range and in spring in the northern part. The eggs are laid on the seabed amongst short algae or hydroids. The eggs hatch in 6–8 weeks and the larvae are pelagic, forming part of the plankton.

References

striped seasnail
Fish of the Arctic Ocean
Fish of the Baltic Sea
Fish of the North Sea
Marine fish of Europe
striped seasnail
Taxa named by Carl Linnaeus